The men's 100 metres competition at the 2002 Asian Games in Busan, South Korea was held on 7–8 October at the Busan Asiad Main Stadium.

Schedule
All times are Korea Standard Time (UTC+09:00)

Records 

 Tim Montgomery's world record was rescinded in 2005.

Results

1st round 
 Qualification: First 4 in each heat (Q) and the next 4 fastest (q) advance to the semifinals.

Heat 1 
 Wind: −0.4 m/s

Heat 2 
 Wind: −1.1 m/s

Heat 3 
 Wind: +0.6 m/s

Semifinals 
 Qualification: First 4 in each heat (Q) advance to the final.

Heat 1 
 Wind: −0.8 m/s

Heat 2 
 Wind: +0.5 m/s

Final 
 Wind: +0.3 m/s

References

External links 
Results

Men's 00100 metres
2002